Splendrillia koruahinensis is an extinct species of sea snail, a marine gastropod mollusk in the family Drilliidae.

Description
The length of the holotype (apex broken) attains 23.7 mm, its diameter 8.8 mm.

Distribution
This extinct marine species was endemic to New Zealand

References

 Maxwell, P.A. (2009). Cenozoic Mollusca. pp. 232–254 in Gordon, D.P. (ed.) New Zealand inventory of biodiversity. Volume one. Kingdom Animalia: Radiata, Lophotrochozoa, Deuterostomia. Canterbury University Press, Christchurch.

External links
 Bartrum, J. A., and A. W. B. Powell. "Mollusca from Kaawa Creek beds, west coast, south of Waikato River." Transactions of the New Zealand Institute. Vol. 59. 1928

koruahinensis
Gastropods of New Zealand